Guardiola arguta is a rare North American species of plants in the family Asteraceae. It is found only in northern Mexico in the state of Chihuahua.

References

arguta
Flora of Chihuahua (state)
Plants described in 1886